Emil Šmatlák (January 27, 1916 – July 16, 2006) was a Czechoslovak sprint canoeist who competed in the late 1930s.

He completed in the K-1 1000 m event at the 1936 Summer Olympics in Berlin, but was eliminated in the heats.

References
Emil Šmatlák's profile at Sports Reference.com
Emil Šmatlák at the Social Security Death Index

1916 births
2006 deaths
Canoeists at the 1936 Summer Olympics
Czech male canoeists
Czechoslovak male canoeists
Olympic canoeists of Czechoslovakia